Roig is a Catalan surname. Roig translates as 'red' in English. It may refer to:

People 
 Alex Soler-Roig, former F1 driver from Spain
 Arturo Andrés Roig, Argentine philosopher
 Charles Michael Roig, American Architect born in New York City
 Evan Roig, American mixed martial arts fighter born in Chicago, Illinois
 Juan Roig Alfonso (1949), Spanish businessman, president of the Spanish supermarket chain Mercadona
 Juan Ramón Epitié-Dyowe Roig, commonly known as just Juan Epitié, Equatorial Guinea international footballer, born in Spain
 Jorge Larena-Avellaneda Roig, Spanish footballer born in Canary Islands
 Joan Rigol i Roig, Catalan-Spanish politician
 Pablo Sicilia Roig, Spanish footballer born in Canary Islands
 Rubén Epitié-Dyowe Roig, commonly known as Rubén Epitié, Equatorial Guinea international footballer, born in Spain
 Susana Barrientos Roig, Miss Bolivia 1998 and representative of Bolivia at Miss Universe 1999
 Juan Tomás Roig y Mesa, Cuban scientist and botanist

See also 
 Lifson–Roig model
 Rojo, Castilian (Spanish) form (masculine, singular)
 Rojas, Castilian (Spanish) form (feminine, plural)

Other meanings 
 ROIG is the ICAO code of Ishigaki Airport.

Catalan-language surnames